Hrabovčík is a village and municipality in Svidník District in the Prešov Region of north-eastern Slovakia.

History
In historical records, the village was first mentioned in 1548.

Geography
The municipality lies at an altitude of 285 metres and covers an area of 7.102 km². It has a population of about 326 people.

Genealogical resources
The records for genealogical research are available at the state archive "Statny Archiv in Presov, Slovakia"

 Roman Catholic church records (births/marriages/deaths): 1775-1895 (parish B)
 Greek Catholic church records (births/marriages/deaths): 1870-1895 (parish A)

See also
 List of municipalities and towns in Slovakia

References

External links
 
 
https://web.archive.org/web/20070513023228/http://www.statistics.sk/mosmis/eng/run.html
Surnames of living people in Hrabovcik

Villages and municipalities in Svidník District
Šariš